Cormano is a comune (municipality) in the Metropolitan City of Milan in the Italian region Lombardy, located about  north of Milan.

Cormano borders the following municipalities: Paderno Dugnano, Bollate, Cusano Milanino, Bresso, Novate Milanese, Milan.

It was previously served by the Cormano-Cusano Milanino railway station, which was closed in 2015, and replaced by the Cormano-Cusano Milanino railway station.

References

External links
Official website

Cities and towns in Lombardy